The standard Gibbs free energy of formation (Gf°) of a compound is the change of Gibbs free energy that accompanies the formation of 1 mole of a substance in its standard state from its constituent elements in their standard states (the most stable form of the element at 1 bar of pressure and the specified temperature, usually 298.15 K or 25 °C).

The table below lists the standard Gibbs function of formation for several elements and chemical compounds and is taken from Lange's Handbook of Chemistry. Note that all values are in kJ/mol.  Far more extensive tables can be found in the CRC Handbook of Chemistry and Physics and the NIST JANAF tables.  The NIST Chemistry WebBook (see link below) is an online resource that contains standard enthalpy of formation for various compounds along with the standard absolute entropy for these compounds from which the standard Gibbs free energy of formation can be calculated.

See also
Thermochemistry
Calorimetry

References

External links
NIST Chemistry WebBook

Thermodynamic free energy